The 1994 FAS Premier League season was the seventh season of the FAS Premier League, then the top tier of football in Singapore. The league was won by Australian club Perth Kangaroos IFC in their only season.

League table

Teams

References

Defunct football competitions in Singapore